The Treaty of Desmichels, also known as the Desmichels Treaty, was signed on 26 February 1834 by Abd el-Kader and French military officials, led by General Louis Alexis Desmichels. As a result of the agreement, France acknowledged Abd-el-Kader as the bey (governor) of Mascara, as well as the independent sovereign ruler of Oran in Algeria.

See also
List of treaties

External links
Chronology: The July Monarchy (1830 - 1848)
The Encyclopedia of World History (2001)
Armed Conflicts Events Database: First Jihad of Abd al Qadir 1832 - 1834

Treaties of French Algeria
1834 in France
1834 treaties
Treaties of the July Monarchy
French Algeria
1834 in Algeria
Algeria–France relations
February 1834 events